The Golden Bear is the highest prize awarded for the best film at the Berlin International Film Festival. The bear is the heraldic animal of Berlin, featured on both the coat of arms and flag of Berlin.

History
The winners of the first Berlin International Film Festival in 1951 were determined by a West German panel, with five winners of the Golden Bear, divided by categories and genres.

Between 1952 and 1955, the winners of the Golden Bear were determined by the audience members.

In 1956, the Fédération Internationale des Associations de Producteurs de Films formally accredited the festival, and since then, the Golden Bear has been awarded by an international jury.

The award 

The statuette shows a bear standing on its hind legs and is based on the 1932 design by German sculptor Renée Sintenis of Berlin's heraldic mascot that later became the symbol of the festival. It has been manufactured since either the first or third edition by art foundry Hermann Noack.

It original award was redesigned in a larger version in 1960, with the left arm of the bear was raised as opposed to the right in the former model.

The figurine consists of a bronze core, which is then plated with a layer of gold.

Winners 

 Notes
 # Denotes ex-aequo win

Multiple winners 
The following have won the award twice:
Ang Lee (1993 & 1996)

See also
Silver Bear and other awards at the Berlin International Film Festival
Palme d'Or, the highest prize awarded at the Cannes Film Festival
Golden Lion, the highest prize awarded at the Venice Film Festival

References

External links 

Berlinale website
IMDb

Berlin International Film Festival
 
 
 
Awards for best film
German film awards
International film awards
Lists of films by award